William Henry Moore (16 October 1863 – 25 February 1956) was an Australian cricketer who represented both New South Wales and Western Australia at first-class level.

From Maitland, New South Wales, Moore came from a large cricketing family, with his father, uncle, brother, and two of his nephews all playing first-class cricket for New South Wales. One of his nephews was Charlie Macartney, who later played Test cricket for the Australian national cricket team. Moore played all four matches for New South Wales in the 1893–94 Sheffield Shield, playing as a wicket-keeper. The second of these matches, against South Australia at the Sydney Cricket Ground, was played alongside his brother, Leon Moore, the only time the brothers played together at first-class level.

Batting right-handed, Moore's highest first-class score, 31 not out, was made in the return match against South Australia, at the Adelaide Oval. Later in the 1890s, Moore moved to Fremantle, Western Australia, and captained Western Australia in a match against South Australia in April 1899, held at the WACA Ground. Having also played grade cricket for Fremantle teams, he later returned to New South Wales, where he died in Lane Cove, a suburb of Sydney, on 25 February 1956.

See also
 List of New South Wales representative cricketers
 List of Western Australia first-class cricketers

References

1863 births
1956 deaths
Australian cricketers
Australian people of English descent
Cricketers from New South Wales
New South Wales cricketers
People from Maitland, New South Wales
Western Australia cricketers
Wicket-keepers